Haakon VII (born Prince Carl of Denmark; 3 August 187221 September 1957) was King of Norway from November 1905 until his death in September 1957.

Originally a Danish prince, he was born in Copenhagen as the son of the future Frederick VIII of Denmark and Louise of Sweden. Prince Carl was educated at the Royal Danish Naval Academy and served in the Royal Danish Navy. After the 1905 dissolution of the union between Sweden and Norway, Prince Carl was offered the Norwegian crown. Following a November plebiscite, he accepted the offer and was formally elected King of Norway by the Storting. He took the Old Norse name Haakon and ascended to the throne as Haakon VII, becoming the first independent Norwegian monarch since 1387.

As king, Haakon gained much sympathy from the Norwegian people. Although the Constitution of Norway vests the King with considerable executive powers, in practice Haakon confined himself to a representative and ceremonial role while rarely interfering in politics, a practice continued by his son and grandson. 

Norway was invaded by Nazi Germany in April 1940. Haakon rejected German demands to legitimise the Quisling regime's puppet government, vowing to abdicate rather than do so. He refused to abdicate after going into exile in Great Britain. As such, he played a pivotal role in uniting the Norwegian nation in its resistance to the invasion and the subsequent five-year-long occupation during the Second World War. He returned to Norway in June 1945 after the defeat of Germany.

He became King of Norway when his grandfather Christian IX was still reigning in Denmark, and before his father and elder brother became kings of Denmark. During his reign he saw his father Frederick VIII, his elder brother Christian X, and his nephew Frederick IX ascend the throne of Denmark, in 1906, 1912 (also of Iceland from 1918 to 1944), and 1947 respectively. Haakon died at the age of 85 in September 1957, after having reigned for nearly 52 years. He was succeeded by his only son, who ascended to the throne as Olav V.

Early life

Birth and family

Prince Carl was born on 3 August 1872 at his parents' country residence, Charlottenlund Palace north of Copenhagen, during the reign of his paternal grandfather, King Christian IX. He was the second son of Crown Prince Frederick of Denmark (the future King Frederick VIII), and his wife Louise of Sweden. His father was the eldest son of King Christian IX and Louise of Hesse-Kassel, and his mother was the only daughter of King Charles XV of Sweden (who was also king of Norway as Charles IV), and Louise of the Netherlands. At birth, he was third in the succession to the Danish throne after his father and older brother, but without any real prospect of inheriting the throne. The young prince was baptised at Charlottenlund Palace on 7 September 1872 by the Bishop of Zealand, Hans Lassen Martensen. He was baptised with the names Christian Frederik Carl Georg Valdemar Axel, and was known as Prince Carl (namesake of his maternal grandfather the King of Sweden-Norway).

Prince Carl belonged to the Schleswig-Holstein-Sonderburg-Glücksburg (often shortened to Glücksburg) branch of the House of Oldenburg. The House of Oldenburg had been the Danish royal family since 1448; between 1536 and 1814 it also ruled Norway, which was then part of the Kingdom of Denmark-Norway. The house was originally from northern Germany, where the Glücksburg (Lyksborg) branch held their small fief. The family had links with Norway beginning from the 15th century. Several of his paternal ancestors had been kings of Norway in union with Denmark and at times Sweden. They included Christian I of Norway, Frederick I, Christian III, Frederick II, Christian IV, as well as Frederick III of Norway who integrated Norway into the Oldenburg state with Denmark, Schleswig and Holstein. His subsequent paternal ancestors had been dukes in Schleswig-Holstein. Christian Frederick, who was King of Norway briefly in 1814, the first king of the Norwegian 1814 constitution and struggle for independence, was his great-granduncle.

Childhood and education

Prince Carl was raised with his siblings in the royal household in Copenhagen, and grew up between his parents' residence in Copenhagen, the Frederick VIII's Palace, an 18th-century palace which forms part of the Amalienborg Palace complex in central Copenhagen, and their country residence, Charlottenlund Palace, located by the coastline of the Øresund strait north of the city. In contrast to the usual practise of the period, where royal children were brought up by governesses, the children were raised by Crown Princess Louise herself. Under the supervision of their mother, the children of the Crown Princess received a rather strict Christian-dominated upbringing, which was characterized by severity, the fulfillment of duties, care and order.

As a younger son of the Crown Prince, there was little expectation that Carl would become king. He was third in line to the throne, after his father and elder brother, Prince Christian and spent his early life in the shadow of his elder brother. Carl was less than two years younger than Christian, and the two princes were educated together and had a joint confirmation at Christiansborg Palace Chapel in 1887. 

After his confirmation, as was customary for princes at that time, Prince Carl was expected to start a military education. It was decided that he, in accordance with his own wishes, should enter the Royal Danish Navy. He was educated at the Royal Danish Naval Academy from 1889 to 1893, graduating as a second lieutenant. In 1894 he was promoted to the rank of first lieutenant and remained in service with the Royal Danish Navy until 1905.

Marriage

On 22 July 1896, in the Private Chapel of Buckingham Palace, Prince Carl married his first cousin Princess Maud of Wales. Princess Maud was the youngest daughter of the Prince of Wales, the future King Edward VII of the United Kingdom, and his wife, Princess Alexandra of Denmark, eldest daughter of King Christian IX and Queen Louise. The wedding was attended by the bride's grandmother, the 77-year-old Queen Victoria.

After the wedding, the couple settled in Copenhagen, where Prince Carl continued his career as a naval officer. The bride's father gave them Appleton House on the Sandringham Estate as a country residence for his daughter's frequent visits to England. It was there that the couple's only child, Prince Alexander, the future Crown Prince Olav (and eventually King Olav V of Norway), was born on 2 July 1903.

Accession to the Norwegian throne

Background and election

After the Union between Sweden and Norway was dissolved in 1905, a committee of the Norwegian government identified several princes of European royal houses as candidates for the Norwegian crown. Although Norway had legally had the status of an independent state since 1814, it had not had its own king since 1387. Gradually, Prince Carl became the leading candidate, largely because he was descended from independent Norwegian kings. He also had a son, providing an heir-apparent to the throne, and the fact that his wife, Princess Maud, was a member of the British Royal Family was viewed by many as an advantage to the newly independent Norwegian nation.

The democratically minded Carl, aware that Norway was still debating whether to remain a kingdom or to switch instead to a republican system of government, was flattered by the Norwegian government's overtures, but he made his acceptance of the offer conditional on the holding of a referendum to show whether monarchy was the choice of the Norwegian people.

After the referendum overwhelmingly confirmed by a 79 percent majority (259,563 votes for and 69,264 against) that Norwegians desired to remain a monarchy, Prince Carl was formally offered the throne of Norway by the Storting (parliament) and was elected on 18 November 1905. When Carl accepted the offer that same evening (after the approval of his grandfather Christian IX of Denmark), he immediately endeared himself to his adopted country by taking the Old Norse name of Haakon, a name which had not been used by kings of Norway for over 500 years. In so doing, he succeeded his maternal great-uncle, Oscar II of Sweden, who had abdicated the Norwegian throne in October following the agreement between Sweden and Norway on the terms of the separation of the union.

On the morning of 20 November, a large crowd gathered outside King Haakon and Queen Maud's residence in Bernstorff's Palace in Copenhagen. The attendees greeted the royal couple as they appeared in the window and started singing Ja, vi elsker dette landet. Later the same day, King Christian IX of Denmark received a delegation from the Storting in an audience in Christian VII's Palace at Amalienborg. The delegation conveyed the message that the king's grandson had been elected King of Norway, while Christian IX expressed his consent to the election of Prince Carl. The head of the delegation, the President of the Storting Carl Berner, conveyed a greeting and congratulations from the Norwegian people, and expressed the people's wishes for a happy cooperation. The king replied: 
Mr. President of the Storthing, gentlemen. The first greeting from the Representatives of the Norwegian People, who in their unanimous Storthing decision on 18 November has elected me their King, has touched me deeply. The people have thereby shown me a confidence which I know how to appreciate, and which I hope will still grow stronger as it gets to know my wife and me. As it will be known to you, gentlemen, it was at my request that the newly concluded referendum took place. I wanted to be sure that it was a people and not a party that wanted me to be king, as my task above all should be to unite, not divide. My life I will devote to the good of Norway, and it is the fervent wish of my wife and I that the people who have chosen us will unite to cooperate and strive towards this great goal, and with full confidence I can then take as my motto: ALL FOR NORWAY.

Arrival in Norway 

On 23 November, the new royal family of Norway left Copenhagen on the Danish royal yacht, the paddle steamer Dannebrog and sailed into the Oslofjord. At Oscarsborg Fortress, they boarded the Norwegian naval ship . After a three-day journey, they arrived in Kristiania (now Oslo) early on the morning of 25 November 1905 where the king was received at the harbour by the Prime Minister of Norway Christian Michelsen. On the deck of the Heimdal, the Prime Minister gave the following speech to the king:

For almost 600 years, the Norwegian people have not had their own king. Never has he been completely our own. Always have we had to share him with others. Never has he had his home with us. But where the home is, there will also be the fatherland. Today it is different. Today, Norway's young king comes to build his future home in Norway's capital. Named by a free people as a free man to lead his country, he will be completely our own. Once again, the Norwegians' king will be the strong, unifying mark for all national deeds in the new, independent Norway ...

Two days later, on 27 November, Haakon VII took his constitutional oath before parliament as Norway's first independent king in 518 years. However, Norway counts 18 November, the day of his election, as the formal beginning of his reign.

Coronation 

On 22 June 1906, King Haakon and Queen Maud were solemnly crowned and anointed in the Nidaros Cathedral in Trondheim by the Bishop of Trondheim Vilhelm Andreas Wexelsen. The coronation was in keeping with the constitutional mandate, but many Norwegian statesmen had come to regard coronation rites as "undemocratic and archaic". The coronation clause was deleted from Norway's constitution in 1908, and although coronations are not expressly banned under current Norwegian legislation, this became the last coronation of a Norwegian monarch. In the period before and after the coronation, the king and Queen made an extensive coronation journey through Norway. 

The King and Queen moved into the Royal Palace in Oslo. Haakon became the first monarch to use the palace permanently and the palace was therefore refurbished for two years before he, Queen Maud and Crown Prince Olav could move in. After the coronation, King Haakon and Queen Maud also received the estate Kongesæteren at Holmenkollen in Oslo as a gift from the Norwegian people.

Early reign

King Haakon gained much sympathy from the Norwegian people. He travelled extensively through Norway. As king, Haakon endeavored to redefine the role of the monarchy in egalitarian Norway and to find a balance between the informal Norwegian way of life and the monarchy's need for formal representation. Although the Constitution of Norway vests the King with considerable executive powers, in practice nearly all major governmental decisions were made by the Government (the Council of State) in his name. Haakon confined himself to non-partisan roles without interfering in politics, a practice continued by his son and grandson.  However, his long rule gave him considerable moral authority as a symbol of the country's unity. The Norwegian explorer and Nobel Prize laureate Fridtjof Nansen became a friend of the Royal Family.

In 1927, the Labour Party became the largest party in parliament and early the following year Norway's first Labour Party government rose to power. The Labour Party was considered to be "revolutionary" by many and the deputy prime minister at the time advised against appointing Christopher Hornsrud as Prime Minister. Haakon, however, refused to abandon parliamentary convention and asked Hornsrud to form a new government. In response to some of his detractors he stated, "I am also the King of the Communists".

Crown Prince Olav married his cousin Princess Märtha of Sweden on 21 March 1929. She was the daughter of Haakon's sister Ingeborg and Prince Carl, Duke of Västergötland. Olav and Märtha had three children: Ragnhild (1930–2012), Astrid (born 1932) and Harald (born 1937), who was to become king in 1991.

Queen Maud died unexpectedly while visiting the United Kingdom on 20 November 1938. In 1939, King Haakon toured southeast Montana and parts of the proposed secessionist state of Absaroka, with supporters of the secession movement claiming this event as formal recognition of their state.

Resistance during World War II

The German invasion

Norway was invaded by the naval and air forces of Nazi Germany during the early hours of 9 April 1940. The German naval detachment sent to capture Oslo was opposed by Oscarsborg Fortress. The fortress fired at the invaders, sinking the heavy cruiser Blücher and damaging the heavy cruiser Lützow, with heavy German losses that included many soldiers, Gestapo agents, and administrative personnel who were to have occupied the Norwegian capital. This led to the withdrawal of the rest of the German flotilla, preventing the invaders' planned dawn occupation of Oslo. The German's delay in occupying Oslo, along with swift action by the president of the Storting, C. J. Hambro, created the opportunity for the royal family, the cabinet, and most of the 150 members of the Storting (parliament) to make a hasty departure from the capital by special train.

The Storting first convened at Hamar the same afternoon, but with the rapid advance of German troops, the group moved on to Elverum. The assembled Storting unanimously enacted a resolution, the so-called Elverum Authorization, granting the cabinet full powers to protect the country until such time as the Storting could meet again.

The next day, Curt Bräuer, the German Ambassador to Norway, demanded a meeting with Haakon. The German diplomat called on Haakon to accept Adolf Hitler's demands to end all resistance and appoint Vidkun Quisling as prime minister. Quisling, the leader of Norway's fascist party, the Nasjonal Samling, had declared himself prime minister hours earlier in Oslo as head of what would be a German puppet government; had Haakon formally appointed him, it would effectively have given legal sanction to the invasion. Bräuer suggested that Haakon follow the example of the Danish government and his brother, Christian X, which had surrendered almost immediately after the previous day's invasion, and threatened Norway with harsh reprisals if it did not surrender. Haakon told Bräuer that he could not make the decision himself, but could only act on the advice of the Government.

In a meeting in Nybergsund, the King reported the German ultimatum to the cabinet sitting as a council of state. Haakon told the cabinet:
I am deeply affected by the responsibility laid on me if the German demand is rejected. The responsibility for the calamities that will befall people and country is indeed so grave that I dread to take it. It rests with the government to decide, but my position is clear.

For my part I cannot accept the German demands. It would conflict with all that I have considered to be my duty as King of Norway since I came to this country nearly thirty-five years ago.

Haakon went on to say that he could not appoint Quisling as prime minister, since he knew neither the people nor the Storting had confidence in him. However, if the cabinet felt otherwise, the King said he would abdicate so as not to stand in the way of the Government's decision.

Nils Hjelmtveit, Minister of Church and Education, later wrote:
This made a great impression on us all.  More clearly than ever before, we could see the man behind the words; the king who had drawn a line for himself and his task, a line from which he could not deviate.  We had through the five years [in government] learned to respect and appreciate our king, and now, through his words, he came to us as a great man, just and forceful; a leader in these fatal times to our country.

Inspired by Haakon's stand, the government unanimously advised him not to appoint any government headed by Quisling.  Within hours, it telephoned its refusal to Bräuer. That night, NRK broadcast the government's rejection of the German demands to the Norwegian people. In that same broadcast, the government announced that it would resist the German invasion as long as possible, and expressed their confidence that Norwegians would lend their support to the cause.

After Norway was eventually conquered, Quisling "transformed [the country] into a one-party fascist state and recruited 6,000 Norwegians to fight alongside the Germans on the Russian front". A very small percentage of the population supported Quisling and many joined the Norwegian resistance movement. After the war, Quisling was convicted of treason and executed.

Norwegian campaign

The following morning, 11 April 1940, in an attempt to wipe out Norway's unyielding king and government,  bombers attacked Nybergsund, destroying the small town where the Government was staying. The Norwegian king and his ministers took refuge in the snow-covered woods and escaped harm, continuing farther north through the mountains toward Molde on Norway's west coast. Haakon and Crown Prince Olav took up residence in a forest cabin in Målselvdalen valley in inner Troms County, where they would stay until evacuation to the United Kingdom.

The Allies had a fairly secure hold over northern Norway until late May. The situation was dramatically altered, however, by their deteriorating situation in the Battle of France. With the Germans rapidly overrunning France, the Allied high command decided that the forces in northern Norway should be withdrawn. The Royal Family and Norwegian Government were evacuated from Tromsø on 7 June aboard HMS Devonshire with a total of 461 passengers.  This evacuation became extremely costly for the Royal Navy when the German warships Scharnhorst and Gneisenau attacked and sank the nearby aircraft carrier HMS Glorious with its escorting destroyers HMS Acasta and HMS Ardent. Devonshire did not rebroadcast the enemy sighting report made by Glorious as it could not disclose its position by breaking radio silence. No other British ship received the sighting report, and 1,519 British officers and men and three warships were lost.  Devonshire arrived safely in London and King Haakon and his Cabinet set up a Norwegian government in exile in the British capital.

Government in exile

Initially, King Haakon and Crown Prince Olav were guests at Buckingham Palace, but at the start of the London Blitz in September 1940, they moved to Bowdown House in Berkshire. The construction of the adjacent RAF Greenham Common airfield in March 1942 prompted another move to Foliejon Park in Winkfield, near Windsor, in Berkshire, where they remained until the liberation of Norway. The King's official residence was the Norwegian Legation at 10 Palace Green, Kensington, which became the seat of the Norwegian government in exile. Here Haakon attended weekly Cabinet meetings and worked on the speeches which were regularly broadcast by radio to Norway by the BBC World Service. These broadcasts helped to cement Haakon's position as an important national symbol to the Norwegian resistance. Many broadcasts were made from Saint Olav's Norwegian Church in Rotherhithe, where the Royal Family were regular worshippers.

On Hitler's orders, Terboven attempted to coerce the Storting to depose the King; the Storting declined, citing constitutional principles. A subsequent ultimatum was made by the Germans, threatening to intern all Norwegians of military age in German concentration camps. With this threat looming, the Storting's representatives in Oslo wrote to their monarch on 27 June, asking him to abdicate. The King declined, politely replying that the Storting was acting under duress. The King gave his answer on 3 July, and proclaimed it on BBC radio on 8 July.

After one further German attempt in September to force the Storting to depose Haakon failed, Terboven finally decreed that the Royal Family had "forfeited their right to return" and dissolved the democratic political parties.

During Norway's five years under German control, many Norwegians surreptitiously wore clothing or jewellery made from coins bearing Haakon's "H7" monogram as symbols of resistance to the German occupation and of solidarity with their exiled King and Government, just as many people in Denmark wore his brother's monogram on a pin. The King's monogram was also painted and otherwise reproduced on various surfaces as a show of resistance to the occupation.

After the end of the war, Haakon and the Norwegian royal family returned to Norway aboard the cruiser , arriving with the First Cruiser Squadron to cheering crowds in Oslo on 7 June 1945, exactly five years after they had been evacuated from Tromsø. Crown Prince Olav had returned a few weeks earlier, on 13 May 1945.

Post-war years

After his return, Haakon did not continue the political role that he had played during the war, and limited himself to his constitutional duties as head of state. In the late summer of 1945 he went on an extensive tour of Norway to examine the war damage and to give consolation to the population. Because of his role during the war and his personal integrity, Haakon VII was considered the highest moral authority in the country and enjoyed great esteem in all classes of the population.

In 1947, the Norwegian people, by public subscription, purchased the royal yacht Norge for the King.

In 1952, he attended the funeral of his wife's nephew King George VI and openly wept.

The King's granddaughter, Princess Ragnhild, married businessman Erling Lorentzen (of the Lorentzen family) on 15 May 1953, being the first member of the new Norwegian royal family to marry a commoner.

Haakon lived to see two of his great-grandchildren born; Haakon Lorentzen (b. 23 August 1954) and Ingeborg Lorentzen (b. 3 February 1957).

Crown Princess Märtha died of cancer on 5 April 1954.

King Haakon VII fell in his bathroom at the Bygdøy Royal Estate (Bygdøy kongsgård) in July 1955. This fall, which occurred just a month before his eighty-third birthday, resulted in a fracture to the thighbone and, although there were few other complications resulting from the fall, the King was left using a wheelchair. The once-active King was said to have been depressed by his resulting helplessness and began to lose his customary involvement and interest in current events. With Haakon's loss of mobility, and as his health deteriorated further in the summer of 1957, Crown Prince Olav appeared on behalf of his father on ceremonial occasions and took a more active role in state affairs.

Death and succession 

Haakon died at the Royal Palace in Oslo on 21 September 1957. He was 85 years old. At his death, Olav succeeded him as Olav V. Haakon was buried on 1 October 1957 alongside his wife in the white sarcophagus in the Royal Mausoleum at Akershus Fortress. He was the last surviving son of King Frederick VIII of Denmark.

Legacy 
Haakon VII is regarded by many as one of the greatest Norwegian leaders of the pre-war period, managing to hold his young and fragile country together in unstable political conditions. He was ranked highly in the Norwegian of the Century poll in 2005.

Honours
The King Haakon VII Sea in East Antarctica is named in the king's honour as well as the entire plateau surrounding the South Pole was named King Haakon VII Vidde by Roald Amundsen when he in 1911 became the first human to reach the South Pole. See Polheim.

In 1914 Haakon County in the American state of South Dakota was named in his honour.

Two Royal Norwegian Navy ships—King Haakon VII, an escort ship in commission from 1942 to 1951, and Haakon VII, a training ship in commission from 1958 to 1974—have been named after King Haakon VII.

For his struggles against the Nazi regime and his effort to revive the Holmenkollen ski festival following World War II, King Haakon VII earned the Holmenkollen medal in 1955 (Shared with Hallgeir Brenden, Veikko Hakulinen, and Sverre Stenersen), one of only 11 people not famous for Nordic skiing to receive this honour. (The others are Norway's Stein Eriksen, Borghild Niskin, Inger Bjørnbakken, Astrid Sandvik, King Olav V (his son), Erik Håker, Jacob Vaage, King Harald V (his paternal grandson), and Queen Sonja (his paternal granddaughter-in-law), and Sweden's Ingemar Stenmark).

Honorary military appointments
Admiral of the Royal Danish Navy, 20 November 1905, created by his father King Frederick VIII.
Honorary Admiral of the Royal Navy
Honorary Lieutenant in the Royal Navy, 7 February 1901, created by his father-in-law King Edward VII shortly after his accession.
Honorary Colonel of the Royal Artillery
 Honorary Colonel of the Norfolk Yeomanry, 11 June 1902 – 21 September 1957
 Colonel-in-Chief, The Green Howards, 12 May 1942 – 21 September 1957

National
 :
 Knight of the Elephant, 3 August 1890
 Cross of Honour of the Order of the Dannebrog, 3 August 1890
 Grand Commander of the Dannebrog, 28 July 1912
 King Christian X's Freedom Medal
 Commemorative Medal for King Christian IX and Queen Louise's Golden Wedding anniversary
 Commemorative Medal for King Christian IX's 100th birthday
 Commemorative Medal for King Frederik VIII's 100th birthday
 :
 War Cross with Sword
 Gold Medal for Outstanding Civic Achievement
 Grand Master of the Order of St. Olav, 18 November 1905

Foreign

In popular culture
Haakon was portrayed by Jakob Cedergren in the 2009 NRK drama series Harry & Charles, a series that focused on the events leading up to the election of King Haakon in 1905. Jesper Christensen portrayed the King in the 2016 film The King's Choice (Kongens nei) which was based on the events surrounding the German invasion of Norway and the King's decision to resist. The film won widespread critical acclaim, and was Norway's submission for the Academy Award for Best Foreign Language Film at the 89th Academy Awards. The film made the shortlist of nine finalists in December 2016. Haakon was portrayed by Søren Pilmark in the 2020 NRK drama series Atlantic Crossing, a series regarding Crown Princess Märtha's handling of the royal family exile from 1939 to 1945.

Ancestry

See also
 List of state visits made by Haakon VII of Norway
 List of covers of Time magazine (1920s), (1930s)

References

Citations

Bibliography

External links

 Official Website of the Royal House of Norway
 King Haakon − biography (Official Website of the Royal House of Norway)
 Prince Carl (Haakon VII) at the website of the Royal Danish Collection at Amalienborg Palace
 The Royal Norwegian Order of St Olav − H.M. King Haakon VII the former Grand Master of the Order

|-

1872 births
1957 deaths
20th-century Norwegian monarchs
Norwegian monarchs
Danish princes
House of Glücksburg (Norway)
House of Glücksburg (Denmark)
Norwegian people of World War II
Governments in exile during World War II
Protestant monarchs
19th-century Danish naval officers
20th-century Danish naval officers
Presidents of the Organising Committees for the Olympic Games
Recipients of the War Cross with Sword (Norway)
Holmenkollen medalists
Grand Commanders of the Order of the Dannebrog
Recipients of the Cross of Honour of the Order of the Dannebrog
Grand Crosses of the Order of the White Lion
Grand Croix of the Légion d'honneur
Recipients of the Croix de Guerre 1939–1945 (France)
Extra Knights Companion of the Garter
Honorary Knights Grand Cross of the Order of the Bath
Honorary Knights Grand Cross of the Royal Victorian Order
Bailiffs Grand Cross of the Order of St John
Recipients of the War Cross (Greece)
Grand Crosses of the Order of the Sun of Peru
3
3
3
Recipients of the Order of St. Anna, 1st class
Recipients of the Order of the White Eagle (Russia)
Recipients of the Order of Saint Stanislaus (Russian)
Knights of the Golden Fleece of Spain
Grand Crosses with Diamonds of the Order of the Sun of Peru
Burials at the Royal Mausoleum (Norway)
Sons of kings
Recipients of the Order of the White Eagle (Poland)
Recipients of orders, decorations, and medals of Ethiopia